Alive is a 2017 live album by American Appalachian band Rising Appalachia. Alive was named an "Album of the Year 2017" by The Arts Desk. The album was compiled from recordings made at live shows over the previous two years.

Critical reception
Kath Galasso reviewed the album for On Stage Magazine, quoting the band as saying that Alive "...is a collection of songs that are telling of the time. A time where the veil has been lifted and we want people to WAKE UP, to be WOKE, to be ALIVE."

The album was featured by Spill Magazine, along with an interview with Leah Song. It was also reviewed by Erick Mertz for the UK magazine Bearded, who wrote "In total, the performance is complete. Banter between songs keeps the fire burning. Rising Appalachia allows the performance to take on its own energy, up and down, like the life cycle of joys and sorrows that it aims to replicate," although he was disappointed at the lack of variety and had hoped for more of a "political edge."

Alive was named an "Album of the Year 2017" by The Arts Desk.

Track listing

References

Citations

Works cited

External links

2017 live albums
Rising Appalachia albums